Dolunay Soysert (born 25 March 1973) is a Turkish actress.

Soysert first rose to prominence with her role as Latife Hanım in the movie Cumhuriyet. She appeared in various plays staged at Istanbul City Theatres, Dostlar Theatre, Craft Theatre, and Toy Theatre. She is also one of the founders of Istanbul Folk Theatre. For her performance on stage in an adaptation of Insignificance, she was given the Most Successful Actress award at the 9th Afife Theatre Awards. In addition to her career on stage and television, she has appeared in a number of movies, including Veda (2010), Ölümden Kalma (2012), and Yarım Kalan Mucize (2012).

Life and career
Dolunay Soysert was born on 25 March 1973 in Adana. Her family moved to Ankara when she was three or four years old due to her father's job requirements. She spent her primary and middle school years in Ankara, and finished high school in Istanbul at Private Mode College.

After graduating from college, she simultaneously studied acting at the Müjdat Gezen Art Center and earned her bachelor's degree from the School of Art History and Archeology at Istanbul University. She then worked as an actress at the Istanbul City Theatres for four years. She made her debut on stage in 1995 with a role in an adaptation of Blood Wedding, which was directed by Başar Sabuncu. She later received a nomination for the Most Successful Supporting Actress award at the 1st Afife Theatre Awards for her role in Silvanlı Kadınlar, which was staged between 1996 and 1997. 

Soysert made her cinematic debut with a role in Sekizinci Saat, which was directed by Cemal Gözütok. She then landed roles in comedy series such as Çılgın Bediş (1996), Kaygısızlar, and Baskül Ailesi. She subsequently moved to England and later to the United States to finish her studies. She studied drama and theatre at the University of Nebraska–Lincoln. She lived in New York City for three years and worked different jobs. Soysert received lessons on cinema and television acting at the Sally Johnson Studios.

After returning to Turkey she appeared in various stage and television productions. Notably, she appeared in the series Sultan Makamı (2003) and Omuz Omuza (2004). She portrayed the character of Derya in Bir İstanbul Masalı and played the role of Leyla in Bebeğim (2006). In the movie Mavi Gözlü Dev, which tells the life of Nâzım Hikmet, Soysert portrayed the famous poet's wife . In an adaptation of Insignificance which was staged at Dostlar Theatre, Soysert portrayed Marilyn Monroe. She also had the leading role of Ayşe in the operetta Ayşe, which went on stage at Gülriz Sururi-Engin Cezzar Theatre. For her role in Insignificance, Soysert won the Most Successful Actress award at the 9th Afife Theatre Awards.

In 2006, together with some of the Istanbul City Theatres artists, including Bahtiyar Engin, Yıldıray Şahinler, Levent Üzümcü and Kemal Kocatürk, Soysert founded the Istanbul Folk Theatre. She also took part in the community's first stage adaptation, Can Tarlası In 2006, she married actor Sinan Tuzcu. The couple divorced in 2016. In 2008, Soysert had a role in Sürmanşet, which was written by Tuzcu and staged by the Istanbul Folk Theatre and Beşiktaş Cultural Center. For her role in this play, she received a noination for the Most Successful Actress award at the 13th Afife Theatre Awards.

In 2011, Soysert received her master's degree in advanced acting from Kadir Has University. She continued her television career by appearing in the series Benim Annem Bir Melek, Adanalı, Başrolde Aşk (2011), Muhteşem Yüzyıl (2014), and Urfalıyam Ezelden (2014). She also had roles in the movies Orada (2009), Veda (2010), Ölümden Kalma (2012), and Yarım Kalan Mucize (2012). Besides acting, Soysert also worked as an acting coach and did commercial voiceovers. She has continued her career on stage and in 2010 had a role in the play Cam which was staged by Theatre Gaga and Aysa Production Theatre, followed by Contradictions in 2015 which was staged by Craft Theatre, and the one-woman show Kul in 2018 which was an adaptation of Seray Şahiner's novel.

Filmography

Film

Television

Streaming films and series

TV programs 
 Tam Kıvamında (cooking program)
 7'den 77'ye (served as hostess in the program presented by Barış Manço)

Theatre

Awards

References

External links
 
 Dolunay Soysert ~ SinemaTürk

1973 births
Living people
People from Adana
Turkish people of Circassian descent
Turkish film actresses
Turkish television actresses
Turkish stage actresses
Istanbul University alumni
20th-century Turkish actresses